Gothic Cottage may refer to

Carpenter Gothic, the architectural style, or an example of that style applied to a cottage
Gothic Cottage (Suffield, Connecticut), listed on the NRHP in Hartford County, Connecticut
William J. Rotch Gothic Cottage, New Bedford, Massachusetts, NRHP-listed
John Wesley Mason Gothic Cottage, Braceville, Ohio, listed on the NRHP in Trumbull County, Ohio
Charles Brown Gothic Cottage, North Bloomfield, Ohio, listed on the NRHP in Trumbull County, Ohio